Pseudaeromonas is a genus of bacteria from the family of Aeromonadaceae.

References

Aeromonadales
Bacteria genera
Taxa described in 2017